Aldar Properties PJSC (شركة الدار العقارية Sharikah al-Dār al-`Iqāriyyah) is a real estate development, management and investment company with headquarters in Abu Dhabi, United Arab Emirates. The company's shares are traded on the Abu Dhabi Securities Exchange. 

Aldar develops and manages major projects within the Abu Dhabi Emirate such as Al Raha Beach, Al Raha Gardens and Yas Island, which includes the Yas Marina Circuit, Ferrari World and Yas Hotel Abu Dhabi. Aldar introduced their new project “Lea” located in the north side of the Yas Island having a collection of Residential Land. Lea at Yas Island offers waterfront living alongside parks, promenade and waterside walkways in addition access to all of Yas Acres amenities. The property portfolio further includes the company's headquarters, Gate and Arc Towers in Al Reem Island, Coconut Island, the Abu Dhabi Central Market (Souq), Al Jimi Shopping Centre, Noor Al Ain, Al Gurm Resort, and Al Mamoura – the Mubadala Development Company and Environment Agency Abu Dhabi Headquarters Building.

History 

Aldar was founded on 12 January 2004. The shares were listed in 2005.

In 2013 the company merged with Sorouh Real Estate. The combined entity continues to operate under the Aldar name.

In December 2017, Aldar acquired the International Tower in Abu Dhabi.

In March 2018, Aldar announced a ″strategic partnership″ with Emaar, a leading developer from Dubai.

In 2010, Aldar was hit hard by the global financial crisis, which caused property prices to plummet and left the company with a significant amount of debt. In response, the Abu Dhabi government stepped in with a $10 billion bailout package, which included the acquisition of some of Aldar's assets.

Since then, Aldar has rebounded and become one of the leading real estate developers in the UAE. The company has completed a number of high-profile projects, including the Gate Towers, which are three residential towers located on Reem Island in Abu Dhabi, and the World Trade Center Abu Dhabi, which is a mixed-use development that includes office space, a hotel, and residential apartments.

In recent years, Aldar has also focused on developing sustainable and eco-friendly projects, such as the Mamsha Al Saadiyat development, which is a beachfront residential community that was designed with sustainability in mind.

Today, Aldar Properties continues to play an important role in the development of Abu Dhabi and the UAE, with a portfolio of projects that includes residential communities, commercial buildings, and hospitality projects.

Aldar and Dubai Holding have partnered to develop projects in Dubai in 2023

Projects 
The most important projects implemented by the company:

 The Gate Towers and Arch Tower project on Al Reem Island is a residential project. The number of residences is estimated at 3,533 units, with an area of 465,870 square meters.
 The Union Plaza project in Khalifa City, with an area of 132,116 square meters, is a residential project, the number of residences is estimated at 789 units.
 Al Bateen Park project in Al Raha Beach is a residential project. The number of housing units is estimated at 359 units, with an area of 102,491 square meters.
 Al Bandar project in Al Raha Beach is a residential project with an estimated number of housing units of 511 units.
 Al Rayana project, next to Abu Dhabi Golf Club, the number of housing units is estimated at 1,537 units, with a total floor area of 212,933 square meters.
 Al Zina project in Al Raha Beach, which is a residential project with an estimated number of 1,221 units.

Al Fahid Island 
Al Fahid Island is a natural island located off the coast of Abu Dhabi island.

It is a mixed purpose community with both residential, retail and commercial units.

Al Fahid Island is a 3.4 million square metre land bank. Aldar bought Al Fahid Island for $680m.

Al Fahid Island is Located between Yas Island and Saadiyat Island.

Financial performance 
For the year 2022, Aldar has posted a net profit of AED 3.1 billion.

See also 

 Eagle Hills Properties
 Emaar Developments
 Union Properties PJSC

References 
2021 Formula One World Championship

External links 
 
 "Company Overview of Aldar Properties PJSC," Bloomberg L.P.

Property companies of the United Arab Emirates
Emirati companies established in 2004
Real estate companies established in 2004
Companies based in Abu Dhabi